The Hatsavita Mountain Training Center is a Ministry of Internal Affairs (Russia) (or MVD) training facility located in Labinsk, Krasnodar Krai, southern Russia. The MVD, together with the Federal Security Service (FSB), carries out most internal security operations in Chechnya.

The "Hatsavita" mountain training center was organized in 2005 to increase the effectiveness of Russian Army special forces (Spetsnaz GRU) during fighting in North Caucasus Mountains, especially Chechnya and Dagestan.

Courses
The center works year-round and the training process takes 4–5 weeks. Soldiers learn the basics of rock climbing, mountain tactics, mountaineering, etc.
Russian Special Forces training photos

See also
 List of mountain warfare forces
 Spetsnaz GRU
 Alpha Group
 Vympel
 Rus (special forces)
 Vityaz (MVD)
 OMON
 SOBR
 High Mountain Military School
 Mountain Leader Training Cadre
 Mountain Warfare Training Center
 Army Mountain Warfare School
 Mountain Warfare Training Camp Michael Monsoor
 High Altitude Warfare School

Notes

Further reading
Isby, David C., Weapons and tactics of the Soviet Army, Jane's Publishing Company Limited, London, 1988
Carey Schofield, 'The Russian Elite: Inside Spetsnaz and the Airborne Forces,' Greenhill, London, 1993

External links 
  Russian Special Ops Units
  Ministry of Internal Affairs special forces
  https://web.archive.org/web/20050309013355/http://www.kommersant.ru/k-vlast/get_page.asp?page_id=2005769-22.htm
  Russian Special Forces

Military education and training in the Soviet Union
Military installations of the Soviet Union
Special forces of Russia
Mountain warfare training installations